The Rochester City School District is a public school district that serves approximately 24,900 students in the city of Rochester, New York. It is currently operating with a budget of $983 million, which comes out to approximately $39,500 per student. This is, according to Census Bureau data, $14,000 more than the New York State average of $25,500 per student, and two and a half times the national average of $14,500 per student.

Organization
The school district is run by a board of education that sets school policy and approves school spending.  The board hires a superintendent under contract to carry out its policies.

Board of Education 
The board of education consists of seven members, elected biennially, who serve staggered four-year terms.

The current board members are:

Cynthia Elliott, President 
Board Liaison to: Abraham Lincoln School No. 22, Dr. Alice Holloway Young School of Excellence, Dr. Martin Luther King, Jr. School No. 9, Franklin Lower and Upper Schools, Leadership Academy for Young Men, Rochester International Academy
Term Expires: December 2025
Beatriz LeBron, Vice President
Board Liaison to: All City High, James Monroe Lower and Upper Schools, Clara Barton School No. 2, Virgil I. Grissom School No. 7, Anna Murray-Douglass Academy School No. 12, Children's School of Rochester School No. 15, Dr. Charles T. Lunsford School School No. 19, Adlai E. Stevenson School No. 29
Term Expires: December 2023
Ricardo Adams, Commissioner
Board Liaison to: East Lower and Upper Schools, Northeast College Preparatory High School, Northwest Junior High, Wilson Foundation Academy, Roberto Clemente School No. 8, Dr. Walter Cooper Academy School No. 10, John Walton Spencer School School No. 16, Pinnacle School No. 35, Andrew J. Townson School No. 39, and Rochester Early Childhood Education Center (RECEC)
Term Expires: December 2023
Amy Maloy, Commissioner
Board Liaison to: LyncX Academy, Home Hospital Instruction, NorthSTAR, School of the Arts, John Williams School No. 5, Dr. Louis A. Cerulli School No. 34, Montessori Academy School School No. 53, World of Inquiry School School No. 58
Term Expires: December 2023
James Patterson, Commissioner
Board Liaison to: OACES Program, Youth and Justice Program, Enrico Fermi School No. 17, Charles Carroll School No. 46, Helen Barrett Montgomery School No. 50, Flower City School No. 54
Term Expires: December 2025
Willa Powell, Commissioner
Board Liaison to: School Without Walls, Francis Parker School No. 23, Nathaniel Hawthorne School No. 25, Henry Hudson School No. 28, John James Audubon School No. 33, Mary McLeod Bethune School No. 45, Frank Fowler Dow School No. 52
Term Expires: December 2023
Camille Simmons, Commissioner
Board Liaison to: Edison Career & Technology High School, P-Tech Pathways to Technology at Edison, Joseph C. Wilson Magnet High School, Rochester Early College International High School, Rochester Preschool Parent Program, Rise Community School No. 106, George Mather Forbes School No. 4, Abelard Reynolds School No. 42
Term Expires: December 2025

Superintendent and supporting team

Facilities

Schools

Pre-Kindergarten Centers
Florence S. Brown PreK Center at School No. 33 (PreK), Program Administrator - Dr. Margaret Brazwell
Rochester Early Childhood Education Center NE (PreK–1), Director - Lisa Traficante-Loncao

Elementary schools
Clara Barton School No. 2 (PreK–6), Principal - Andrea Lee, Assistant Principal - Evangelina Johnson
George Mather Forbes School No. 4 (PreK–6), Principal - Karon Jackson, Assistant Principal - Delores Davis
John Williams School No. 5 (PreK–8), Principal - Terrilyn Hammond, Assistant Principals - David Gizzi and Loretta Hollomon
Virgil I. Grissom School No. 7 (PreK–6), Principal - David Lincoln, Assistant Principal - Mark Wilkins
Roberto Clemente School No. 8 (PreK–8), Principal - Stephanie Thompson, Assistant Principals - Andrew Grantham and Tiffany Lee
Dr. Martin Luther King Jr. School No. 9 (PreK–6), Principal - Sharon Jackson, Assistant Principals - Burnice Green and Maria Ortiz-Viera
Dr. Walter Cooper Academy School No. 10 (PreK–6), Principal - Eva Thomas, Assistant Principals - Jason Wertz
Anna Murray-Douglass Academy No. 12 (PreK–8), Principal - Kathleen Trepanier, Assistant Principals - Margaret Crowley and Faith Hart
The Children's School of Rochester No. 15 (PreK–6), - Principal - Jay Piper, Assistant Principal - Chanta Willis
John Walton Spencer School No. 16 (PreK–6), Principal - Lisa Garrow, Assistant Principal - Robert Burns
Enrico Fermi School No. 17 (PreK–8), Principal - Yajaira Nguyen, Assistant Principals - Nancy Coddington and William Cronmiller
Dr. Charles T. Lunsford School No. 19 (PreK–8), Principal - Moniek Silas-Lee, Assistant Principal - Elizabeth Cross
Abraham Lincoln School No. 22 (PreK–6), Principal - Clinton Bell, Assistant Principal - Kristal Haines
Francis Parker School No. 23 (PreK–6), Principal - Kathryn Yarlett-Fenti, Assistant Principal - Carla Roberts
Nathaniel Hawthorne School No. 25 (PreK–6), Principal - Adrienne Steflik, Assistant Principal - Denise Quamina
Henry Hudson School No. 28 (K–8), Principal - Susan Ladd, Assistant Principals - Brenda Harrington and Jennifer Monroe-DeWitz
Adlai E. Stevenson School No. 29 (PreK–6), Principal - Joseph Baldino, Assistant Principal - Thomas Anderson
John James Audubon School No. 33 (PreK–6), Principal - Melody Martinez-Davis, Assistant Principals - Margaret Brazwell (Florence S. Brown PreK), Bonnie Ellis (Blue House), Michelle Killings (Gray House), and Thomas Pappas (Gold House)
Dr. Louis A. Cerulli School No. 34 (PreK–6), Principal - D'Onnarae Johnson, Assistant Principal - Akilah Collins
Pinnacle School No. 35 (K–6), Principal - Brenda Torres-Santana, Assistant Principal - Valerie L. Holberton
Andrew J. Townson School No. 39 (PreK–6), Principal - Shalonda Garfield, Assistant Principal - TBA
Abelard Reynolds School No. 42 (PreK–6), Principal - Lisa Whitlow, Assistant Principal - Mark Davis
Mary McLeod Bethune School No. 45 (PreK–8), Principal and Administrator Grades PreK-2 - Christine Manuele-Turnquist, Assistant Principal Grades 3-5 - Patricia Brockler, Assistant Principal Grades 6-8 - LoWan Brown
Charles Carroll School No. 46 (PreK–6), Principal - Gina DiTullio, Assistant Principal - Theodora Waters
Helen Barrett Montgomery School No. 50 (PreK–8), Principal - Connie Wehner, Assistant Principal - Felecia Drysdale and Lynda Mortis
Frank Fowler Dow School No. 52 (PreK–6), Principal - Mary Ferguson, Assistant Principal - Redell Freeman
Montessori Academy School No. 53 (PreK–6), Principal - Dr. Kimberly Harris-Pappin, Assistant Principal - Timothy Graziano
The Flower City School No. 54 (PreK–6), Principal - Jody Durick, Assistant Principal - Tylynn Presha
World of Inquiry School No. 58 (K–12), Principal - Kwame Donko-Hanson, Assistant Principals - Stephen Campe and Nyree Wims-Hall, Academy Director, Jennifer Johnson
RISE Community School No. 106 (PreK–6), Principal - Kelly Lampman, Assistant Principal - Glenna Smith
Joseph C. Wilson Foundation Academy (K–8), Principal - Rhonda Neal, Assistant Principal - David Dorsey

Secondary schools
Dr. Alice Holloway Young School of Excellence (7–8), Principal - Deborah Washington, Assistant Principal - Jeanne Markman
East Lower School (6–8), Principal - LeAndrew Wingo, Assistant Principals - Jeffrey Halsdorfer, Jennifer Rees, and Joseph Saia
East Upper School (9–12), Principal - Marlene Blocker, Assistant Principals - Akua Kankam, Maycanitza Perez, Deon Rodgers, and Michele Sadik, Freshman Academy Director - Edward Mascadri
Edison Career & Technology High School (9–12), Principal - Jacob Scott, Assistant Principals - Josephine Buonomo-Cilento, Heidi Jackson, and Jerome Vacca, Academy Directors - Robert Goldsberry and Babette Phillips
Franklin Lower School (7–8), Principal - Stephanie Harris, Assistant Principal - Terry Richards
Franklin Upper School (9–12), Principal - Richard Smith, Assistant Principals - Cheryl Donatella, Donna Groff-McNulty, Brandi Smith, and Steve Soprano
James Monroe Lower School (7–8), Principal - Wakili Moore, Assistant Principal - Meybhol Sapienza
James Monroe Upper School (9–12), Principal - Jason Muhammad, Assistant Principals - Anthony Bianchi, Bernadette Regan, and Anthony Rodriguez
Joseph C. Wilson Magnet High School (9–12), Principal - Julie VanDerWater, Assistant Principals - Chantal Lischer and Gary Reynolds
Northeast College Preparatory High School (9–12), Principal - Nakia Burrows, Assistant Principals - Heidi Jackson and Kristin Pryor
Northwest Junior High at Douglass (7–8), Principal - Rodney Moore, Assistant Principal - Kathleen Garcia
Rochester Early College International High School (9–12), Principal - Uma Mehta, Assistant Principal - Stacy Watts
School of the Arts (7–12), Principal - Kelly A. Nicastro, Assistant Principals - Samantha Brody, Mario Belculfine, Brian Chandler, and Alan Tirre, Athletic Director - David Michelsen, Arts Center Director - Andrea Gregoire
School Without Walls (9–12), Principal - Coretta Wright, Assistant Principal - Lakisha Wilson

School and alternative programs
All City High (10–12), Principal - Armando Ramirez, Assistant Principal - Megan Brady-Onisk, Academy Director - Susen Hart
Family Learning Center at OACES - Program Administrator - Paul Burke
Home Hospital Instruction (7–12), Director - Christopher Smith
LyncX Academy (7–12), Director - Christopher Smith
NorthSTAR Program, Director of Alternative Education Programs - James Nunez
Rochester International Academy, Principal - Mary Andrecolich-Diaz
Youth & Justice, Director - Michael A. Allen, II

Former schools

Charlotte High School - closed 2016

Gallery

Performance
In 2019, the Rochester City School District was ranked the 3rd worst school district in upstate New York and in 2017 was ranked the 8th worst in New York State

In 2007, the New York State Education Department named 14 Rochester elementary schools among the state's "most improved" schools in English language arts and/or math. Newsweek ranked Wilson Magnet High School 49th among the nation's top 100 high schools based on advanced curriculum.

The Children's Institute, a non-profit children's advocacy organization, has ranked the district's pre-K program one of the best in the nation.

Configuration redesign
In 2003, a plan to redesign the grade-level configuration was approved by the board of education.  It changed the district from one of elementary schools (preK–5), middle schools (6–8) and high schools (9–12) to one of elementary schools (pre-K–6) and secondary schools (7–12). The plan was implemented in stages over four years.

Media coverage 
Given the district's continued struggles there has been much local media coverage analyzing the district from varying perspectives, and most recently this has been done through the Democrat and Chronicle's Time to Educate Series. The motto of this media initiative is "Something. Must. Change." In 2018 the editorial board of that paper wrote "It is time to declare an emergency".

References

External links

New York State School Boards Association

Education in Rochester, New York
School districts established in 1841
School districts in New York (state)